Snow Hill is a manor house located south of Laurel, Maryland, off Maryland Route 197, in Prince George's County.  Built between 1799 and 1801, the -story brick house is rectangular, with a gambrel roof, interior end chimneys, and shed dormers.  It has a center entrance with transom and a small gabled porch.  A central hall plan was used, with elaborate interior and corner cupboards. The original south wing was removed and rebuilt, and the home restored in 1940. The Late Georgian style house was the home of Samuel Snowden, part owner of extensive family ironworks, inherited from his father Richard Snowden. and is now owned and operated by the Maryland-National Capital Park and Planning Commission as a rental facility.

Snow Hill was listed on the National Register of Historic Places in 1974.

Gallery

References

External links
, including photo in 1999, at Maryland Historical Trust website
Snow Hill, 13209 Laurel-Bowie Road, Laurel vicinity, Prince George's County, MD: 20 photos and 15 data pages, at Historic American Buildings Survey
Snow Hill, Log Dependency, 13209 Laurel-Bowie Road, Laurel vicinity, Prince George's County, MD: 1 photo and 1 data page, at Historic American Buildings Survey

Historic American Buildings Survey in Maryland
Houses in Prince George's County, Maryland
Houses on the National Register of Historic Places in Maryland
Buildings and structures in Laurel, Maryland
Houses completed in 1801
Georgian architecture in Maryland
National Register of Historic Places in Prince George's County, Maryland